Ajnaatha Theerangal is a 1979 Indian Malayalam film, directed by M. Krishnan Nair and produced by S. Kumar. The film stars Vidhubala, Raghavan and Sathaar in the lead roles. The film has musical score by M. K. Arjunan.

Cast

Raghavan as Ravi
Ambika as Geetha 
Vidhubala as Kavitha 
Sathaar as Surendran/Umesh
Ravikumar as Mohan
Reena  as Urmila
Sreelatha Namboothiri as Leela
Sulochana as Manjula
Thikkurussy Sukumaran Nair as Justice Sankara Menon
Sukumari as Kalyana P Nair
Bahadoor as Parameswaran Nair
Hari as Johnson

Soundtrack
The music was composed by M. K. Arjunan and the lyrics were written by Sreekumaran Thampi.

References

External links
 

1979 films
1970s Malayalam-language films
Films directed by M. Krishnan Nair